Alfredo Junqueira Dala is an Angolan politician for MPLA and a member of the National Assembly of Angola.

References

Living people
Members of the National Assembly (Angola)
MPLA politicians
Year of birth missing (living people)
Place of birth missing (living people)
21st-century Angolan politicians